Catenibacterium is a Gram-positive, non-spore-forming and anaerobic genus from the family  Erysipelotrichidae, with one known species (Catenibacterium mitsuokai).

See also
 List of bacterial orders
 List of bacteria genera

References

Further reading 
 

Coprobacillaceae
Monotypic bacteria genera
Bacteria genera